Žakovo is a village in the municipality of Trebinje, Republika Srpska, Bosnia and Herzegovina.

References

Villages in Republika Srpska
Populated places in Trebinje